Mark McDonnell is a Scottish actor.

He is probably best known for his role in sketch comedy show Velvet Soup.

External links

Mark McDonnell on BFI
Mark McDonnell on STV
Mark McDonnell on Twitter

Living people
Year of birth missing (living people)
Scottish male television actors
Scottish male comedians